Musharraf Hussain (187115 November 1966) was an Indian Muslim League politician and former Minister in the government of Bengal Presidency.

Early life
Musharraf was born on 1871 in Kazi family of Cheora, Chauddagram, Comilla, Bengal Presidency, British Raj. His father was Kazi Mokarram Ali, who was lawyer at Comilla Judge Court. He graduated from Hughli Mohsin college in 1899. He completed his law degree from the Calcutta University. After graduation he married Faizunnesa Begum. His wife was the daughter of a tea planter through who he inherited tea estates in Jalpaiguri.

Career
Musharraf started his legal career in the Jalpaiguri district bar. In 1918 he was elected to the Bengal Legislative council, he campaigned on issues that affected Muslims of Bengal. He also served in the Bengal Legislative council from 1923 to 1936. In 1926 he was given the title Khan Bahadur and Nawab by the British Raj. In 1927 he was the minister of Education of the Bengal. He helped in the passage of Compulsory Free Primary Education Bill . He served as the vice president of the Bengal United Muslim Party.

Musharraf was re-elected in 1936 as an independent candidate. He joined the Muslim League after the elections. From 1937 to 1941 he was the minister of Law and Judicial ministry. From 1943 to 1945 he was in charge of another ministry. He was an advocate of the Pakistan Movement. He remained in India after the Partition. He went on to serve in the West Bengal state assembly.

Death
Musharraf died on 15 November 1966.

References

All India Muslim League members
1966 deaths
1871 births
University of Calcutta alumni
People from Comilla District